Cyrille Dumaine (July 8, 1897 – October 11, 1946) was a Canadian politician from Quebec. He was born on July 8, 1897 in Saint-Hugues and was a notary.

Member of Parliament

Dumaine successfully ran as a Liberal Party of Canada candidate for the Bagot district in a 27 January 1930 by-election. He was re-elected there in the 1930 federal election. He did not run for re-election in the 1935 election.

Provincial politics

He ran as a Liberal Party of Quebec candidate in the 1935 election for the district of Bagot and won. He was re-elected in the 1936 election, but his election was cancelled and he lost the subsequent by-election against Union Nationale candidate Philippe Adam.

Dumaine was re-elected in the 1939 and 1944 elections.

Speaker of the House

He served as Deputy Speaker from 1942 to 1943 and as Speaker of the House from 1943 to 1945.

Death

Dumaine died in office on October 11, 1946. He was succeeded by Union Nationale politician Daniel Johnson Sr.

Electoral record

|-
  
|Liberal
|Cyrille Dumaine
|align="right"| acclaimed

References

1897 births
1946 deaths
Liberal Party of Canada MPs
Members of the House of Commons of Canada from Quebec
Quebec Liberal Party MNAs
Quebec notaries
People from Montérégie
Vice Presidents of the National Assembly of Quebec